Yong Sports Academy (YOSA) is a football club in Bamenda, Cameroon. It plays in the country's top division Elite One.

History 
Yong Sports Academy was founded in 2004 by Yong Francis, a former football referee. At that time, it was the only first division team in the Northwest Region of Cameroon. YOSA initially struggled to qualify for Inter-polls, the playoff for qualification for the First Division Championship - mostly against established teams.

In 2013, the team won Cameroon's National Football Cup.

Stadium
The team plays in Stade Municipal Mankon in Bamenda which has a capacity of 5,000 spectators.

The Bamenda Municipal Stadium YOSA has two professional pitches in the Academy situated in the outskirts of Nkwen Bamenda. To accommodate its growing fan base, YOSA plays its matches at the city stadium despite its poor state. This is because the club's fans are mostly based in the city center.

References

External links

Football clubs in Cameroon
Bamenda
Association football clubs established in 2004
2004 establishments in Cameroon